Mallin may refer to:

People

Surname

 Dan Mallin, American entrepreneur

 Elias Mallin (born 1981), American musician

 Fred Mallin (1902–1987), English boxer who competed in the 1928 Summer Olympics

 Harry Mallin (1892–1969), English middleweight amateur boxer
 John A. Mallin (1883—1973), Czech-American mural and fresco painter
 Lesley Mallin (born 1956), female former athlete who competed for England

 Michael Mallin (1874–1916), Irish republican
 Michael A. Mallin, American biologist
 Stewart Mallin (1924–2000), Anglican priest 

 Tom Mallin (1927–1977), English novelist, playwright and artist

Places
 Mallin, a village and a former municipality in Mecklenburg-Vorpommern, Germany

See also
 Mallín a type of meadow and wetland found in southern Chile and Argentina